Wendy Turner-Webster (born Wendy Turner, 5 June 1967) is an English journalist, television presenter and animal rights campaigner.

Early life and education
Born 5 June 1967 in Stoke-on-Trent, Staffordshire, Turner-Webster had two sisters, presenter Anthea Turner and Ruth who had spina bifida and died at the age of 15. Turner-Webster grew up in Norton le Moors, Staffordshire, and was educated at St Dominic's Independent Junior School at Hartshill.

Career
Turner-Webster began her career at Signal Radio, writing, producing and presenting on-air features including film, travel and book reviews.  She also wrote for magazines including OK!. A part-time actress, while appearing in the pantomime Cinderella, she was spotted by a producer from the UK cable channel L!VE TV. Moving to London, she became a news reporter covering sports and fashion. She then hosted her own shows Videobox and the psychic phone-in Revelations with Nina.

Turner-Webster was chosen to take over hosting Channel 4’s Absolutely Animals from Dani Behr; the show was a forerunner to Pet Rescue which Turner-Webster hosted for 7 years. Turner-Webster's other TV projects include BBC One's Your Kids Are In Charge, presented with sister Anthea. She has also presented several episodes of The Last Word for Central Television, and the BBC documentary about domestic violence, Hitting Home.

Animal rights

Turner-Webster is an advocate of animal rights. In 2018, she controversially claimed that guide dogs are "unethical" and should be phased out as they are unable to give consent to work.

Turner-Webster does not eat or wear animal products and is a patron of the Vegan Society, Viva! and the Vegetarian Society. In 2001, Turner-Webster wrote on behalf of PETA to the Duke of Kent as president of the Scout Association, requesting that they retire the angling badge on grounds of cruelty to animals. The proposal was rejected. In 2006, she launched an online footwear company, "Secret Goddess", which specialised in ultra glamorous boots and shoes of non-animal origin.

In November 2010, she became the patron of Chancepixies Animal Rescue, a charity dedicated to educating, rescuing and taking action to prevent dogs in the UK from finding themselves unwanted, abused and killed.

Personal life

Whilst playing Maid Marian in pantomime, Turner-Webster met and began a relationship with actor Gary Webster, who starred in Family Affairs. They married in 1999 and have two sons. The family lives in Surrey.

Filmography
 You Do Too - 2002, TV series, pre
 Robot Wars - 2000, presenter, contestant on Celebrity Special as Gemini
 Your Kids Are In Charge - 2000 for BBC. Co-presenter with sister Anthea

References

External links
 
 Wendy Turner Webster profile at The Speakers Agency

1967 births
British veganism activists
English animal rights activists
English television presenters
Living people
People associated with the Vegetarian Society
People from Stoke-on-Trent